The Italian regional elections of 1980 were held on 8 and 9 June. The fifteen ordinary regions, created in 1970, elected their third assemblies.

Electoral system
The pure party-list proportional representation had traditionally become the electoral system of Italy, and it was adopted for the regional vote too. Each Italian province corresponded to a constituency electing a group of candidates. At constituency level, seats were divided between open lists using the largest remainder method with Droop quota. Remaining votes and seats were transferred at regional level, where they were divided using the Hare quota, and automatically distributed to best losers into the local lists.

Results summary

The election confirmed that the post-war growing march of the Italian Communist Party, which previously seemed unlimited, had been stopped. The Christian Democrats obtained a plurality in Piedmont, even if the ruling leftist alliance maintained its overall majority. Conversely, even if remaining the first party in Ligury, the Communists lost this region because the local Socialists chose to change side, joining a centrist alliance with the DC and its minor allies. In Latium, where an assembly majority change, happened in 1977, had restored a centrist administration, the final ouster of the Communists from the government was confirmed by the polls.

Results by region
1980 Abruzzo regional election
1980 Apulian regional election
1980 Basilicata regional election
1980 Calabrian regional election
1980 Campania regional election
1980 Emilia-Romagna regional election
1980 Lazio regional election
1980 Ligurian regional election
1980 Lombard regional election
1980 Marche regional election
1980 Molise regional election
1980 Piedmontese regional election
1980 Tuscan regional election
1980 Umbrian regional election
1980 Venetian regional election

1980 elections in Italy
Elections in Italian regions
June 1978 events in Europe